Strahinja Eraković (born 22 January 2001) is a Serbian footballer who plays as a 
centre back for Red Star Belgrade.

Club career

Red Star Belgrade
Strahinja Eraković joined Red Star Belgrade in 2010 as a nine-year-old. He played for every youth category for the Belgrade club and was the captain of the Under-19 side. He appeared for the club in the UEFA Youth League in matches against Napoli and Paris Saint-Germain.

He made his first-team debut for Red Star Belgrade on 1 August 2020 in a Superliga match against Novi Pazar. Despite being just 19, he quickly became a first-team regular for the champions of Serbia. In his first season with the senior side, he played against Hoffenheim, Gent and Slovan Liberec in the UEFA Europa League. He was a part of the Red Star Belgrade side that won the first league and cup double after a 14-year wait.

In the 2021/22 campaign, he became one of the most important players for the team and ranked among the players with most minutes spent on the pitch. He was a first-team regular in European competition as well, playing against Braga, Midtjylland and Ludogorets in the Europa League group stage. He captained the side in the away match at Ludogorets. Red Star Belgrade qualified for the competition's knockout stage and Eraković played in both legs as Red Star Belgrade bowed out of the competition with a 4-2 aggregate defeat against Rangers FC of Scotland. Eraković played as Red Star Belgrade secured back-to-back Superliga and Kup Srbije doubles.

At the start of the 2022/23 season, Eraković signed a new contract to remain at Red Star Belgrade until June 2026.

Loan to Grafičar
Eraković spent the 2019/20 season playing for RFK Grafičar, Red Star Belgrade's affiliate club in the Prva liga Srbije, the second tier of Serbian football. Eraković appeared in 21 games and scored two goals for Grafičar.

International career
Eraković was selected for all youth national teams of Serbia and was made captain. He was called up for the senior national team by Dragan Stojković and made his debut in a UEFA Nations League match against Norway at Rajko Mitić Stadium. He was a part of the Serbia team that gained promotion to the Nations League Division A.

In November 2022, he was selected in Serbia's squad for the 2022 FIFA World Cup in Qatar, but he didn't make any appearance there.

Career statistics

Club

International

Honours

Red Star Belgrade
 Serbian SuperLiga (2): 2020–21, 2021–22
 Serbian Cup (2): 2020–21, 2021–22

References

External links
 
 
 
 
 
 

2001 births
Living people
Footballers from Belgrade
Serbian footballers
RFK Grafičar Beograd players
Red Star Belgrade footballers
Serbian First League players
Serbian SuperLiga players
Serbia international footballers
Serbia under-21 international footballers
Serbia youth international footballers
Association football defenders
2022 FIFA World Cup players